José María Pérez also known as  Fe is a consejo popular (i.e. "popular council") and a town in Camajuaní, Cuba nearby towns include Salamanca, Canada De Agua, Prudencia (or Chucho Prudencia), Fénix, Orovio, and Los Maestros.  The town is known as Fe because of the Central in the town, Central José María Pérez, was formerly known as Central Fe.

Economy
According at the DMPF of Camajuani, José María Pérez is a settlement linked to sources of employment or economic development. 

In Fe the sugar cane market is going down and farmers are getting poorer.

Sports 
Fe has one sport club, with it being the Peña Onelio Rodríguez.

Reference 

Populated places in Villa Clara Province